Each year, USA Today, an American newspaper, awards outstanding high school basketball players with a place on its male and female All-USA high school basketball teams. The newspaper names athletes whom it believes to be the best basketball players from high schools around the United States. In addition, one member of each team is named, respectively, the male or female USA Today High School Basketball Player of the Year. The newspaper names two teams, one for male athletes and one for female athletes. The newspaper has named a team every year since 1983. Each year, the newspaper also selects a USA Today High School Boys' Basketball Coach of the Year and a USA Today High School Girls' Basketball Coach of the Year.

Boys' basketball players and coaches of the year
See footnotes

Boys' Basketball Coach of the Year

Girls' Basketball Players and Coaches of the Year
See footnotes

Girls' Basketball Coach of the Year

Teams
Notes
 Bold denotes Boys' Players of the Year, respectively, and ‡ denotes high school juniors.
 The "Hometown" column should contain the player's actual hometown, which is not always the location of the player's high school.

1983 Boys' team
Coach of the Year: Bob Wade (Dunbar High School, Baltimore)

First Team

1984 Boys' team
Coach of the Year: Morgan Wootten (DeMatha Catholic High School, Hyattsville, Maryland)

First Team

1985 Boys' team
Coach of the Year: John Wood (Spingarn High School, Washington, D.C.)

First Team

1986 Boys' team
Coach of the Year: Stu Vetter (Flint Hill Prep, Oakton, Virginia)

First Team

1987 Boys' team
Coach of the Year: Stu Vetter (Flint Hill Prep, Oakton, Virginia)

First Team

1988 Boys' team
Coach of the Year: John Sarandrea (St. Nicholas of Tolentine, Bronx, New York)

First Team

 Chris Jackson changed his name to Mahmoud Abdul-Rauf in 1993, two years after his conversion to Islam.

1989 Boys' team
1st team: Kenny Anderson, Doug Edwards, Allan Houston, Bobby Hurley, Jim Jackson

1990 Boys' team
1st team: Damon Bailey, Shawn Bradley, Jamie Brandon, Eric Montross, Ed O'Bannon

1991 Boys' team
1st team: Alan Henderson, Juwan Howard, Glenn Robinson, David Vaughn, Chris Webber

1992 Boys' team
1st team: Donta Bright, Othella Harrington, Jason Kidd, Rodrick Rhodes, Corliss Williamson,

1993 Boys' team
1st team: Randy Livingston, Jerry Stackhouse, Jacque Vaughn, Rasheed Wallace, Dontonio Wingfield

1994 Boys' team
1st team: Jelani Gardner, Raef LaFrentz, Felipe López, Ricky Price, Jerod Ward

1995 Boys' team
1st team: Shareef Abdur-Rahim, Vincent Carter, Kevin Garnett, Stephon Marbury, Ron Mercer

1996 Boys' team
1st team: Mike Bibby, Kobe Bryant, Ronnie Fields, Winfred Walton, Tim Thomas

1997 Boys' team
1st team: Chris Burgess, Baron Davis, Mark Karcher, Tracy McGrady, Lamar Odom

1998 Boys' team
1st team: Al Harrington, Rashard Lewis, Quentin Richardson, Stromile Swift, Korleone Young

1999 Boys' team
1st team: LaVell Blanchard, Donnell Harvey, Jay Williams, Joseph Forte, DerMarr Johnson.
2nd team: Keith Bogans, Jason Kapono, Brett Nelson, Jason Richardson, Leon Smith
3rd team: Carlos Boozer, Casey Jacobsen, Casey Sanders, Kenny Satterfield, Damien Wilkins

2000 Boys' team
1st team: Eddie Griffin, Darius Miles, Zach Randolph, Marcus Taylor, Gerald Wallace

2001 Boys' team
1st team: Kwame Brown, Eddy Curry, LeBron James, Kelvin Torbert, Dajuan Wagner

2002 Boys' team
Coach of the Year: Leonard Bishop (Lincoln High School, Dallas)

First Team

Second Team

Third Team

2003 Boys' team
1st team LeBron James, Brian Butch, Luol Deng, Ndudi Ebi, Mustafa Shakur

Coach of the Year Dru Joyce II

2004 Boys' team
1st team Dwight Howard, Sebastian Telfair, Josh Smith, Shaun Livingston, Al Jefferson

Coach of the Year Steve Smith

2005 Boys' team
1st team Greg Oden, O. J. Mayo, Monta Ellis, Louis Williams, Josh McRoberts

Coach of the Year Dan Bazzani

2006 Boys' team
Coach of the Year: Jack Keefer (Lawrence North High School, Indianapolis)

First Team

Second Team

Third Team

2007 Boys' team
Coach of the Year: Kevin Boyle (St. Patrick High School, Elizabeth, New Jersey)

First Team

Second Team

Third Team

2008 Boys' team
Coach of the Year: Bob Hurley (St. Anthony High School, Jersey City, New Jersey)

First Team

Second Team

Third Team

 Jennings did not attend any college, as he chose to sign a professional contract with Lottomatica Roma of the Italian Serie A after finishing high school. He was eligible to enter the NBA Draft one year after graduating from high school, and was selected with the 10th overall pick of the 2009 NBA draft by the Bucks.
 Dunigan signed a 3-year contract with Hapoel Migdal of the Israeli Basketball Super League shortly before the start of the 2010–11 college season. Currently, Dunigan is on BC Kalev/Cramo basketball team in the Estonian Estonian Korvapalli Meistriliiga League (also known as EMKL). He was eligible to enter the 2011 NBA draft, but went undrafted.

2009 Boys' team
Coach of the Year: J.R. Holmes (Bloomington South High School, Bloomington, Indiana)

First Team

Second Team

Third Team

2010 Boys' team
Coach of the Year: Vance Downs (Ames High School, Ames, Iowa)

First Team

Second Team

Third Team

2011 Boys' team
Coach of the Year: Bob Hurley (St. Anthony High School, Jersey City, New Jersey)

First Team

Second Team

Third Team

2012 Boys' team
Coach of the Year: Steve Smith (Oak Hill Academy, Mouth of Wilson, Virginia)

First Team

Second Team

Third Team

 Austin ended his college basketball career in 2014 after being diagnosed with Marfan syndrome. After receiving medical clearance to return to play in late 2016, he began playing professionally overseas in 2017.

2013 Boys' team
Coach of the year: Kevin Boyle, Montverde (Florida) Academy
First team

Second team

Third team

2014 Boys' team
Coach of the year: Sharman White, Miller Grove, Lithonia, Ga.
First team

 Mudiay chose to sign with the Guangdong Southern Tigers of the Chinese Basketball Association instead of accepting a scholarship offer from SMU. He was drafted after one season in China.

Second team

Third team

2015 Boys' team
Coach of the year: Melvin Randall, Blanche Ely, Pompano Beach, Florida
First team

Second team

Third team

2016 Boys' team
Coach of the year: Steve Baik, Chino Hills, California
First team

Second team

Third team

2017 Boys' team
Coach of the year: Jack Doss, Mae Jemison, Huntsville, Alabama
First team

Second team

 Bowen signed to play with Louisville, but was suspended before what would have been his freshman season because of an FBI investigation that raised serious questions about his NCAA eligibility, and never played for the school. He enrolled at South Carolina in January 2018, but never played for that school due to NCAA transfer rules. In a later phase of the FBI investigation, further eligibility questions arose, and he declared for the 2018 draft without ever playing in college.

Third team

See also
List of U.S. high school basketball national player of the year awards
USA Today All-USA High School Baseball Team (including Player and Coach of the Year)
USA Today All-USA High School Football Team
National High School Hall of Fame

References

First team picks, 1983–2001

External links
 USA Today Index Page

American basketball trophies and awards
High school basketball in the United States
USA Today
Awards by newspapers